Gary Leah Thomasson (born July 29, 1951) is an American former professional baseball player. He played as an outfielder and first baseman in Major League Baseball (MLB) between 1972 to 1980, most prominently as a member of the San Francisco Giants with whom he played for seven seasons. He also played for the Los Angeles Dodgers, New York Yankees, Seattle Mariners, Montreal Expos, and the Cincinnati Reds. After his Major League Baseball career, he played for the Yomiuri Giants of Japanese Nippon Pro Baseball from 1981 to 1982. Thomasson was a member of the Yankees' 1978 World Series winning team over the Dodgers.

Career
Thomasson attended Oceanside High School in Oceanside, California and was drafted by the San Francisco Giants in the 7th round of the 1969 Major League Baseball Draft. He made his Major League debut on September 5, 1972 at the age of 21, pinch-hitting for pitcher Frank Reberger in a 4–3 Giants' win over the San Diego Padres. In 1973, his first full Major League season, Thomasson hit .285 in 112 games.

Thomasson was traded along with Gary Alexander, Dave Heaverlo, John Henry Johnson, Phil Huffman, Alan Wirth and $300,000 from the Giants to the Athletics for Vida Blue on March 15, 1978. Mario Guerrero was sent to the Athletics just over three weeks later on April 7 to complete the transaction.

Thomasson spent only a few months and 47 games with Oakland before being traded to the New York Yankees for Dell Alston, Mickey Klutts, and $50,000, on June 15, 1978. Eight months later he was on the move again, dealt to the Los Angeles Dodgers for catcher Brad Gulden on February 15, 1979.

Purchased from the Dodgers by the Yomiuri Giants of Japanese Nippon Pro Baseball on December 22, 1980, Thomasson spent his final two professional seasons (1981–82) in Japan. Signed with great fanfare to the biggest contract ever given to a player in the Nippon league, Thomasson was a disappointment in his two years in Japan, coming close to setting the league strikeout record before a knee injury ended his career.

Tokyo writer and conceptual artist Genpei Akasegawa published a book containing photographs of found objects which he termed "Hyperart Thomasson". The book enjoyed a cult following among late-1980s Japanese youth.

References

External links

1951 births
Living people
Major League Baseball outfielders
Los Angeles Dodgers players
San Francisco Giants players
New York Yankees players
Oakland Athletics players
Yomiuri Giants players
American expatriate baseball players in Japan
Baseball players from San Diego
Arizona Instructional League Giants players
Great Falls Giants players
Decatur Commodores players
Amarillo Giants players
Phoenix Giants players